The 1948 Tasmanian state election was held on 21 August 1948.

Retiring Members

Labor
Charles Culley MHA (Denison)

Liberal
Charles Atkins MHA (Denison)

House of Assembly
Sitting members are shown in bold text. Tickets that elected at least one MHA are highlighted in the relevant colour. Successful candidates are indicated by an asterisk (*).

Bass
Six seats were up for election. The Labor Party was defending four seats. The Liberal Party was defending two seats.

Darwin
Six seats were up for election. The Labor Party was defending three seats. The Liberal Party was defending three seats, although Liberal MHA Henry McFie was running as an independent.

Denison
Six seats were up for election. The Labor Party was defending three seats. The Liberal Party was defending two seats. One seat was being defended by independent MHA Rex Townley.

Franklin
Six seats were up for election. The Labor Party was defending three seats. The Liberal Party was defending two seats. Independent MHA George Gray was defending one seat.

Wilmot
Six seats were up for election. The Labor Party was defending three seats. The Liberal Party was defending three seats.

See also
 Members of the Tasmanian House of Assembly, 1946–1948
 Members of the Tasmanian House of Assembly, 1948–1950

References
Tasmanian Parliamentary Library

Candidates for Tasmanian state elections